Bacterial thiol disulfide oxidoreductases (TDOR) are bacterial enzymes which, along with unfolded proteins, are pumped out of a bacterial cell that allow for adhesion and biofilm development, and generally disease development.

Table

References

Bacterial enzymes
Biology-related lists